Scaurotrechodes capensis is a species of beetle in the family Carabidae, the only species in the genus Scaurotrechodes.

References

Trechinae